Club Sport Chavelines Juniors is a Peruvian football club, located in the city of Pacasmayo, La Libertad. The club was founded in 1984 and play in the Liga 2 which is the second division of the Peruvian league.

History
In the 2014 Copa Perú, the club classified to the National Stage, but was eliminated by Cristal Tumbes in the Round of 16.

In the 2016 Copa Perú, the club classified to the National Stage, but was eliminated in the First Round.

In the 2019 Copa Perú, they qualified for the semifinals of the National Stage and participated in the promotion playoffs. In one of their games, they won 24-0.

Honours

Regional 
Liga Departamental de La Libertad:
Winners (2): 2014, 2019
Runner-up (1): 2016

Liga Provincial de Pacasmayo:

Winners (3): 2014, 2016, 2019

Liga Distrital de Pacasmayo:
Winners (3): 2014, 2016, 2019
Runner-up (1): 2017

See also 
List of football clubs in Peru
Peruvian football league system

References 

Football clubs in Peru
Association football clubs established in 1984
1984 establishments in Peru